Vicia lathyroides (spring vetch) is a plant species in the bean family Fabaceae. It is native to Europe and western Asia, and it is known on other continents as an introduced species. It is an annual herb with pealike blue- or purple-tinged flowers about half a centimeter wide and hairless legume pods up to 3 centimeters long.

Description
Vicia lathyroides is an annual with stems up to 12 cm long. The leaves have 2 or 4 pairs of leaflets which end in a tendril or point. The flowers are single up to 6 mm long and without a stalk. The petals are purple and produce a pod up to 20 mm long.

Ecology
In Ireland it is found in sandy ground near the coast.

References

External links
Jepson Manual Treatment
USDA Plants Profile

Washington Burke Museum
Photo gallery

lathy
Plants described in 1753
Taxa named by Carl Linnaeus